Vriescheloo (Gronings: Vraiskeloo) is a village in the municipality of Westerwolde in the Netherlands.

History 
Vrieschloo is a linear settlement on the sand ridge which formed the old road between Groningen and Germany. The village dates from the 11th or 12th century. It started as a peat community, and developed into an agriculture community.

The 19th century smock mill De Korenbloem is located in the village.

Gallery

References

External links 
 

Populated places in Groningen (province)
Westerwolde (municipality)